Vislor Turlough is a fictional character played by Mark Strickson in the long-running British science fiction television series Doctor Who. He was a companion of the Fifth Doctor, being a regular in the programme from 1983 to 1984. Turlough appeared in 10 stories (33 episodes).

Character history
When Turlough first appears in the serial Mawdryn Undead, he is a student of retired Brigadier Lethbridge-Stewart (himself a former companion of the Doctor) at the Brendon Public School, but it becomes apparent that he is not what he seems. He is contacted by the malevolent Black Guardian, who offers to take him home if he kills the Doctor. He also appears familiar with concepts of time travel and matter transmission. At the end of the serial, Turlough asks to accompany the Doctor. Despite Tegan and Nyssa's suspicions, the Doctor accepts Turlough as part of the TARDIS crew.

During the course of the next two serials, Terminus and Enlightenment (collectively known, together with Mawdryn Undead, as the Black Guardian Trilogy), Turlough finds himself unable to decide whether or not to carry out his assignment from the Black Guardian, but eventually rejects him in favour of loyalty to the Doctor. Although always slightly cowardly, with excellent instincts of self-preservation and a streak of ruthlessness, his relationship with the Doctor and Tegan improves with time (Nyssa having departed at the end of Terminus). He is one of the few companions capable of operating many of the TARDIS's systems, being able to run a diagnostic in The Five Doctors and program the TARDIS to retrieve the Doctor in Planet of Fire. Initially expressing a desire to return home, he continues travelling with the Doctor and Tegan until Tegan leaves at the end of Resurrection of the Daleks.

In the very next serial, Planet of Fire, it is revealed that Turlough is a junior ensign commander from the planet Trion. Following a civil war on his home planet, in which his mother was killed, Turlough's family were branded political prisoners. His father and younger brother Malkon were exiled to the planet Sarn whilst Turlough himself became a political exile to Earth watched over by an eccentric Trion agent disguised as a solicitor in Chancery Lane. Also revealed for the first time in this serial is Turlough's first name, Vislor. At the end of the serial, Turlough discovers that political prisoners are no longer mistreated on Trion and decides it is time to return home.

An image of Turlough appears during the Fifth Doctor's regeneration scene in The Caves of Androzani.

Strickson has humorously commented that, not knowing what to do with him, the writers of the television series would often have the villains capture or lock him up, leading to Turlough ending up in various "states of bondage".

List of appearances

Television
Season 20

Mawdryn Undead
Terminus
Enlightenment
The King's Demons

20th anniversary special
The Five Doctors
Season 21

Warriors of the Deep
The Awakening
Frontios
Resurrection of the Daleks
Planet of Fire
The Caves of Androzani (cameo in episode 4)

Audio dramas
Doctor Who: The Monthly Adventures

Phantasmagoria
Loups-Garoux
Singularity
Cobwebs
The Whispering Forest
The Cradle of the Snake
Heroes of Sontar
Kiss of Death
Rat Trap
The Emerald Tiger
The Jupiter Conjunction
The Butcher of Brisbane
Eldrad Must Die!
The Lady of Mercia
Prisoners of Fate
Mistfall
Equilibrium
The Entropy Plague
The Memory Bank and Other Stories
Devil in the Mist
Black Thursday / Power Game
The Kamelion Empire
The Blazing Hour
The End of the Beginning

Doctor Who: The Lost Stories

Nightmare Country

Doctor Who: The Fifth Doctor Adventures

Forty: Volume One
Interlude: I, Kamelion

Doctor Who: Special Releases

The Light at the End

Doctor Who: The Companion Chronicles

 Ringpullworld
 Freakshow

Doctor Who: Short Trips

Gardens of the Dead
The Monkey House

Novels
Make Your Own Adventure
 Crisis in Space by Michael Holt
The Companions of Doctor Who
 Turlough and the Earthlink Dilemma by Tony Attwood
Virgin Missing Adventures
 The Crystal Bucephalus by Craig Hinton
 Lords of the Storm by David A. McIntee
Past Doctor Adventures
 Deep Blue by Mark Morris
 Imperial Moon by Christopher Bulis
 The King of Terror by Keith Topping

Short stories
"Birth of a Renegade" by Eric Saward (Radio Times Doctor Who 20th Anniversary Special)
"Zeitgeist" by Craig Hinton (Decalog 3: Consequences)
"Qualia" by Stephen Fewell (Short Trips: Companions)
"Rome" by Marcus Flavin (Short Trips: The History of Christmas)
"Comforts of Home" by Pete Kempshall (Short Trips: The History of Christmas)
"One Wednesday Afternoon" by Alison Jacobs (Short Trips: A Day in the Life)
"The Assassin's Story" by Andrew Collins (Short Trips: Repercussions)
"Observation" by Ian Farrington (Short Trips: Life Science)
"Lant Land" by Jonathan Morris (Short Trips: Life Science)
"White Man's Burden" by John Binns (Short Trips: Past Tense)
"Last Minute Shopping" by Neil Perryman (Short Trips: A Christmas Treasury)
"The Misadventure of Mark Thorne" by Andy Frankham (Short Trips: Snapshots)
"Piecemeal" by James Swallow (Short Trips: Snapshots)
"Do You Believe in the Krampus?" by Xanna Eve Chown (Short Trips: The Ghosts of Christmas)
"One Step Forward, Two Steps Back" by Chris Thomas (Short Trips: Defining Patterns)
"Gudok" by Mags L Halliday (Short Trips: Transmissions)
"The Darkest Corner" by Adrian Middleton (Shelf Life)
"Fair Exchange" by Mike Morgan (Shelf Life)

Comics
"The Lunar Strangers" by Gareth Roberts and Martin Geraghty (Doctor Who Magazine 215–217)

References

External links

 Vislor Turlough on the BBC's Doctor Who website

Doctor Who aliens
Doctor Who audio characters
Doctor Who companions
Male characters in television
Television characters introduced in 1983